K. Murugaiyan is an Indian politician, belonging to the Communist Party of India (CPI). He was a bonded labourer.

K. Murugaiyan was elected to the Lok Sabha (lower house of the Parliament of India) from the Nagapattinam seat a June 1979 by-election. The by-election had been called after the murder of the incumbent CPI parliamentarian S.G. Murugaiyan.

K. Murugaiyan lost the Nagapattinam seat in the 1980 Indian general election. He finished in second place with 49.02% of the votes. He was close to regaining the seat in the 1984 Indian general election, finishing in second place with 49.53% of the votes.

References

Communist Party of India politicians from Tamil Nadu
Lok Sabha members from Tamil Nadu
India MPs 1977–1979
Possibly living people
People from Nagapattinam district
Living people
Year of birth missing (living people)